Pruitt is a surname of English origin. Notable people with that name include:

Surname
Anna Seward Pruitt (1862–1948), American missionary to China; mother of Ida Pruitt
Austin Pruitt (born 1989), American baseball player
Charles Pruitt (1930-1985), American politician
Cicero Washington Pruitt (1857–1946), American missionary to China; father of Ida Pruitt
Dillard Pruitt (born 1961), American professional golfer
Elinore Pruitt Stewart, (1876–1933), American homesteader in Wyoming and memoirist
Ervin Pruitt, (born 1940), American professional stock car racer
Etric Pruitt (born 1981), American professional football player
Gabe Pruitt (born 1986), American professional basketball player
Greg Pruitt (born 1951), American professional football player
Ida Pruitt (1888–1985), American social worker, author, speaker, and interpreter of Chinese; daughter of C. W. Pruitt and Anna Pruitt
John H. Pruitt (1896–1918), American double Medal of Honor recipient
Jonathan Pruitt Canadian arachnologist
Jordan Pruitt (born 1991), American pop singer
Katie Pruitt (born 1994), American singer-songwriter
Ken Pruitt (born 1957), American politician from Florida; state since 2001
Mary Pruitt (1934–2020), American politician
Mike Pruitt (born 1954), American professional football player
Millus and Myles Pruitt (or Pruett), American blues musicians in the 1920s
MyCole Pruitt, American football player
Ron Pruitt (born 1951), American professional baseball player
Scott Pruitt (born 1968), American politician; EPA administrator 2017-2018; Oklahoma attorney general 2010-2017; Oklahoma state senator 1999–2006
Steven Pruitt (born 1984), American Wikipedian
Wendell O. Pruitt (1920 – 1945) American military pilot
Willie Franklin Pruitt (1860 - 1947), American poet

Given name
Pruitt Taylor Vince

Other

Pruitt–Igoe, a former public housing complex in St. Louis. 

Surnames from nicknames